In the Old Rhythms is a 1982 Soviet comedy film directed by Mikhail Yershov.

Plot 
The film takes place in the 30s of the 20th century in Leningrad. Nikita Fedotov could not enter the conservatory and jumped into the Neva, the policeman Koshkin was able to save him and offered to work in the criminal investigation department. Nikita agreed.

Cast 
 Semyon Morozov as Nikita Fedotov
 Anastasiya Glez
 Nikolay Trofimov as Shtykov
 Zoltán Loker
 Aleksandr Zakharov
 Sergey Filippov
 Mikhail Shchetinin
 Aleksey Kozhevnikov
 Mikhail Aptekman
 Tatyana Piletskaya

References

External links 
 

1982 films
1980s Russian-language films
Soviet comedy films
1982 comedy films